1945 is a 2022 Indian war drama film directed by Sathyasiva and produced by S. N. Rajarajan of K Production. It was simultaneously shot in Tamil and Telugu languages under the same title. The film stars Rana Daggubati, Regina Cassandra, Sathyaraj and Nassar. The film began its production in 2016 but was left unfinished since 2019 due to differences between the producer and the lead actor. 

The Telugu version of the film was released theatrically on 7 January 2022. The Tamil version premiered via a streaming platform on 4 July 2022.

Plot
During the year 1945, the British police stationed in Burma hear the news of a supposed plane crash in which Netaji Subhash Chandra Bose dies presumably. So they devise plans to overthrow the INA started by Bose. The INA also plan to start a rebellion in 1945 in order to subdue the British Raj, with Burma being their organizational center. However an internal dispute arises within the community of INA members after Netaji's death as to whether Netaji Bose supposedly died or not. Adhi is an active member of the INA, who voices out to his fellow INA members, that Netaji still lives, but others fail to listen to him. A depressed Adhi now recalls his past as to how he was inspired to join the INA.

In the year 1942, Adhi was a budding barrister who had come to Burma from India to work under Subbayya- a leading barrister of that time who was also a convoy and friend of the British. It is revealed that Adhi also intended to marry Anandhi, the daughter of Subbayya and both Adhi and Anandhi fall in love when they meet each other. In Burma, Adhi learns of the dismal fate of his fellow Indians who are tortured and killed by some malicious British officers who also loot the wealth of the common people. Adhi also comes to learn of the INA founded by Netaji fighting against the British and inspired by their work he joins their alliance, takes up arms and annihilates many corrupt British officers. On learning this, Subbayya who had initially approved of his daughter's marriage to Adhi, now disapproves of it and tries to separate Adhi from his family. However Adhi and Anandhi still love each other and Adhi's friend somehow tries to convince Subbayya for their wedding. Subbayya hesitantly agrees and so Adhi and Anandhi get married. Meanwhile, a protest ensues between the Indians in Burma and the Britishers there, in which, many innocent people are killed by the British, including Adhi's friend. This enrages Adhi who takes the help of the INA and kills the British governor in a coup. In retaliation, the British soldiers also kill many INA members, however Adhi manages to survive. Meanwhile, Subbayya who learns of Adhi's ways quickly manages to flee with his wife and daughter Anandhi on-board a ship. Before boarding the ship, Anandhi meets Adhi during an ensuing fight between him and the Britishers and she tells him that she's leaving to India on the advice of her father but she still loves him and asks him to finish the mission that he had started and then return to his family in India if destiny permits.

Cast

Production

Development
Sathyasiva first began scripting the film in mid-2015 and approached Jiiva to play the lead role, but the film did not find producers. S. N. Rajarajan, who won the rights for Baahubali: The Conclusion is bankrolling this big budgeted bilingual project, being helmed by Sathyasiva. As Rana Daggubati was picked to play the lead due to closeness of the producer, Regina Cassandra was chosen to pair with Rana after considering several heroines. Later Nassar and Sathyaraj, were also chosen to play important roles than supporting ones. Yuvan Shankar Raja has been roped in compose music for the project, after previously collaborated for director's Kazhugu and Kazhugu 2. On the first look poster release, it was revealed that Sathya Ponmar, Gopi Krishna and E. Thiyagarajan are selected as cinematographer, editor and art director respectively, who three of them previously collaborated with director on his films before. The Tamil version was originally titled Madai Thiranthu before the name was changed to 1945.

Casting
The film features Rana Daggubati and Regina Cassandra in lead roles along with veterans Nassar and Sathyaraj slated for a pivotal roles.

Filming
The principal photography has been commenced at Kochi since 19 August 2016. Depicting Subhas Chandra Bose's Independence movement in the 1940s, huge sets have been erected along the beach for this period drama as the portions for Nassar and Regina Cassandra is being canned. Satyaraj is expected to join the next schedule of shoot in September and Rana Daggubati likely to join the production unit shortly once he wraps Baahubali: The Conclusion. A schedule was completed in October 2017 at Kochi in Kerala and Sri Lanka.  Rana Daggubati went clean-shaven for a portion of the film.

Release 
1945 was released theatrically on 7 January 2022. Earlier, the film was scheduled to be released on 24 January 2020. However, owing to financial differences between the producer and the lead actor, its release was delayed indefinitely. Later, it was scheduled to release on 31 December 2021 before moving to the present date.

The Tamil version was premiered directly on the streaming platform Astro Vaanavil in mid-2022.

Critical Reception 
Pinkvilla gave the film a rating of 1.5/5 and wrote "The film is undone by the inadequate background music and the frivolous graphics.The Britishers are trigger-happy antagonists who behave more like the underwritten villains of mass masala movies..Srivathsan Nadadhur of OTTplay gave 1 out of 5 stars and wrote that "945 is a film that's best erased from your memories. Just behave it didn't even release or exist and you're still not going to miss much. Don't get misled by the big names. The only thing big about the film is that it's one giant bore."

Controversy 
After the first look of the film was released, Rana Daggubati quickly took to his Twitter account, claiming that producer Rajarajan had defaulted on his payments, and was using the announcement of the event as a way to raise money and cheat more people. Daggubati also claimed that the film's status was "unfinished". In response to these accusations, Rajarajan replied to Daggubati on Twitter that it is the director's prerogative to make the final decision whether the film is completed or not. Daggubati replied with a thumbs-up emoji and did not continue the conversation.

Soundtrack 
The soundtrack of the film will be composed by Yuvan Shankar Raja, collaborating with the director for the third time. While the lyrics are written by Mohana Raja and Arul Kamaraj, the audio rights are bagged by Muzik 247.

References

2022 films
2022 multilingual films
Indian multilingual films
Films shot in Kochi
Films set in the British Raj
Films scored by Yuvan Shankar Raja
Films shot in Sri Lanka
Films directed by Sathyasiva
Films set in the Indian independence movement
Indian National Army in fiction
Films set in the 1940s
Films set in 1945
2022 war drama films
Indian war drama films
2020s Tamil-language films
2020s Telugu-language films